P'yŏngnam Onch'ŏn station is a railway station in Onch'ŏn-ŭp, Onch'ŏn county, Namp'o Special City, North Korea, the northern terminus of the P'yŏngnam Line of the Korean State Railway; it was also the southern terminus of the now-closed Namdong Line.

History

Services
Regional passenger trains operate between this station and Tŏkch'ŏn on the P'yŏngdŏk Line (trains 226-227/228-229) and Pot'onggang on the P'yŏngnam Line (trains 225/230). This station also handles local freight traffic – daily-use commodities inbound, and salt and agricultural products outbound – and serves the Onch'ŏn air base of the Korean People's Army Air Force via a short spur.

References

Railway stations in North Korea
Railway stations opened in 1938